Newchapel and Goldenhill railway station was a station on the Potteries Loop Line located between the villages of Newchapel and Goldenhill in Staffordshire, England.

Opened in 1874 the station was known simply as Goldenhill (sometimes referred to as Golden Hill) until November 1912 when it was renamed Newchapel and Goldenhill.

The station closed to passengers in 1964 along with the rest of the Loop. The trackbed is now a walkway but part of the platform edging is still in existence.

References

Disused railway stations in Staffordshire
Railway stations in Great Britain closed in 1964
Railway stations in Great Britain opened in 1874
Former North Staffordshire Railway stations
Beeching closures in England